Bifemelane (INN) (Alnert, Celeport), or bifemelane hydrochloride (JAN), also known as 4-(O-benzylphenoxy)-N-methylbutylamine, is an antidepressant and cerebral activator that is widely used in the treatment of cerebral infarction patients with depressive symptoms in Japan, and in the treatment of senile dementia as well. It also appears to be useful in the treatment of glaucoma. Bifemelane acts as a monoamine oxidase inhibitor (MAOI) of both isoenzymes, with competitive (reversible) inhibition of MAO-A (Ki = 4.20 μM) (making it a reversible inhibitor of monoamine oxidase A (RIMA)) and non-competitive (irreversible) inhibition of MAO-B (Ki = 46.0 μM),  and also acts (weakly) as a norepinephrine reuptake inhibitor. The drug has nootropic, neuroprotective, and antidepressant-like effects in animal models, and appears to enhance the cholinergic system in the brain.

See also 
 Indeloxazine
 Teniloxazine

References 

Amines
Antidepressants
Monoamine oxidase inhibitors
Nootropics
Norepinephrine reuptake inhibitors
Phenol ethers
Reversible inhibitors of MAO-A
Benzhydryl compounds